Oviatt Cole was a Republican politician in the U.S. State of Ohio who was Ohio State Auditor 1863–1864.

When Ohio State Auditor Robert Walker Tayler, Sr. resigned in 1863 to take another position, Oviatt Cole of Medina County, Ohio was appointed by Governor Tod to fill the office.

At the Republican State Convention later in 1863, Cole lost on the first ballot to James H. Godman for the nomination for Auditor.

While living in Litchfield, Ohio, Cole was Recorder of Medina County, Ohio from 1836–1842.

Notes

References

Ohio Republicans
People from Medina County, Ohio
State Auditors of Ohio
Year of birth missing
Year of death missing